Al-Kutba' was a north Arabian god. The name means, roughly, "the scribe"; it comes from the Semitic root K-T-B which means 'to write.' A carving at the foot of Jebal Rumm in Jordan, discovered in 1959 by J. Strugell, is dedicated to al-Kutbay. Another inscription in Wadi Es Siyyagh, on the way to the main spring of Petra contains the phrase "in front of Kutbay, this very god." Other sites around Arabia contain inscriptions dedicated to him.

Kutba' is represented as a betyl in Wadi Rum alongside al-'Uzza. The gender of this god is disputed. Because of the god's name originating from the root word K-T-B or "to write", it is considered that Kutba' was a god of intellect including writing.

Nabataeans and other mercantile Arab tribes brought the worship of al-Kutbay from Petra in Jordan to Egypt. A temple to the god has been discovered at Qasr Gheit, built in characteristic Egyptian style. An altar-base in this temple, is inscribed with the Nabataean dedication: "from Hawyru son of Geram to al-Kutbay."

In the Hellenistic era, al-Kutbay was associated with Hermes and Mercury. This Hermes association may have been a misinterpretation, as Al-Kutbay's distinction as the god of writing may be likened to Hermes Trismegistus, hence the Hermes association.

References

External links
 Nabataean religion
 The god Aktab-Kutbay and his Ichnography

Arabian gods
Knowledge gods
Oracular gods
Commerce gods
Mercurian deities
Scribes